Zayouna is a neighbourhood of east Baghdad, Iraq. It is a mixed-race, upper middle-class area bordering the affluent Karrada suburb.

Organisations based in Zayouna include the Iraq Football Association; the "Baghdad Bulletin", Iraq's English-language news magazine; and Tariq bin Ziad High School, featured in British-American-French television documentary film, The Boys from Baghdad High.

The headquarters of the Assyrian Democratic Movement is based in Zayouna. It was established after the fall of Saddam Hussein.

This neighbourhood has its name from a rich man called Zayouna who participated financially in the construction of an Orthodox Church. A majority of Zayouna is Christian with many ethnicities such as Assyrians, Kurds, and Arabs. Most of the houses that are built in Zayouna tend to range in price from 400,000 to 800,000 United States dollars.

Within the New Baghdad administrative district of the capital, Zayouna it is one of the 89 official neighbourhoods in Baghdad. The post code for Zayouna is 10091.

References

Neighborhoods in Baghdad